The 1996 Major League Baseball season was the final season of league-only play before the beginning of interleague play the following season. The season ended with the New York Yankees defeating the defending champion Atlanta Braves in six games for the World Series title, the Yankees' first championship since 1978. The record for most home runs hit in an MLB regular season, set at 4,458 in 1987, was broken, as the AL and NL combined to hit 4,962 home runs. Only 196 shutouts were recorded in the 2,266 MLB regular-season games. This was the first season in the Divisional Series era to be played to the full 162 games, as the 1994–95 player's strike caused the first two seasons of the era to be abbreviated.

Standings

American League

National League

Postseason

Bracket

Awards and honors
Baseball Hall of Fame
Jim Bunning
Bill Foster
Ned Hanlon
Earl Weaver

Other awards
Outstanding Designated Hitter Award: Paul Molitor (MIN)
Roberto Clemente Award (Humanitarian):  Kirby Puckett (MIN).
Rolaids Relief Man Award: John Wetteland (NYY, American); Jeff Brantley (CIN, National).

Player of the Month

Pitcher of the Month

MLB statistical leaders

Managers

American League

National League

Home Field Attendance & Payroll

Television coverage

Events

January–June
January 8 – For only the seventh time in history, and the first time since 1971, the Baseball Writers' Association of America fails to select a player for induction into the Baseball Hall of Fame.
March 5 – The Veterans Committee elects four new members to the Hall of Fame, and just misses naming a fifth. The group elected includes Earl Weaver, Baltimore Orioles manager for 17 seasons; pitcher Jim Bunning, who won 100 games in each league; 19th-century manager Ned Hanlon, who won pennants in Baltimore and Brooklyn, and Bill Foster, the Negro leagues' pitcher with most wins. Second baseman Nellie Fox receives the necessary 75% of the Committee's votes, but the rules allow for election of only one modern player, and Bunning has more votes.
April 1 – Seven pitches into the first game of the season, at Riverfront Stadium in Cincinnati, home plate umpire John McSherry collapses on the field and dies of a massive heart attack. The game between the Cincinnati Reds and Montréal Expos is postponed, along with the rest of the games scheduled for that day. Reds owner Marge Schott later comes under fire for wanting the game in Cincinnati to continue despite the tragedy (and against the wishes of the players on both teams), saying that she felt "cheated" when it was canceled.
April 6 – Cleveland Indians player Albert Belle hits Sports Illustrated photographer Tony Tomsic in the hand prior to a game between the Indians and Toronto Blue Jays at Jacobs Field. The angry Indians outfielder had told the photographer to stop taking pictures of him doing pre-game stretches and Tomsic complied. Belle then throws a ball from the outfield that breaks the skin of the photographer's hand in two places and draws blood.
May 14 – New York Yankee pitcher Dwight Gooden pitches the first Yankee Stadium no-hitter in 3 years as his Yankees beat the Seattle Mariners 3–0.
May 17 – Baltimore Orioles catcher Chris Hoiles hits a walk-off grand slam against the Seattle Mariners in the bottom of the ninth, down by three, with two outs and a full count.  This is only the second occurrence of this cliché ultimate game ending event in the history of professional baseball; during the 1988 season, Alan Trammell became the first to accomplish this feat in a 7-6 comeback win over the Yankees. 
June 1 – Major League Baseball games begin to be broadcast on Fox.
June 6 – The Boston Red Sox beat the Chicago White Sox 7–4, as John Valentin of Boston hits for the cycle and the White Sox complete a triple play. It marks the first time since July 1, 1931, that both events occur in the same game.

July–December
July 9 – At Veterans Stadium, the National League defeats the American League 6–0 in the All-Star Game. Ken Caminiti and Mike Piazza hit home runs for the winners. The game is the first All-Star contest in which no walks are issued by either team. The Orioles' Cal Ripken Jr. starts the game, despite suffering a broken nose when he accidentally catches a forearm from White Sox reliever Roberto Hernández when the latter slips on the tarp during the AL team photo shoot.
September 6 – Eddie Murray of the Baltimore Orioles becomes the 15th player in major league history to hit 500 home runs. He homers off Felipe Lira in the seventh inning of the Orioles' 5–4, 12-inning loss to the Detroit Tigers at Camden Yards. Murray also joins Hank Aaron and Willie Mays as the only big leaguers to reach both this milestone and also the 3,000 hit mark.
September 6 – Brett Butler returns to the Los Angeles Dodgers line-up four months after having surgery for throat cancer. The 39-year-old center fielder scores the decisive run in a 2-1 victory over the Pittsburgh Pirates.
September 17 – Hideo Nomo pitches a no-hitter against the Colorado Rockies, leading the Los Angeles Dodgers to a 9–0 victory. Nomo walks four batters and strikes out eight.
October 24 – The Atlanta Braves play their final game at Atlanta–Fulton County Stadium vs. the New York Yankees.
October 26 – The New York Yankees take their fourth victory in a row from the Atlanta Braves, 3-2, giving them the 1996 World Series and their 23rd World Championship. Starter Jimmy Key gets the win with help from closer John Wetteland, whose four saves earn him the MVP trophy.

Movies
Ed
Soul of the Game (TV)
The Fan

Deaths
 February 8 – Del Ennis, 70, All-Star left fielder for the Phillies who had seven 100-RBI seasons, leading the NL for the 1950 "Whiz Kids" team, and was the team's career home run leader (259) until 1980
 February 19 – Charles O. Finley, 77, owner of the Athletics from 1960 to 1981 who moved the team from Kansas City to Oakland, and was known for numerous gimmicks and controversies; won three straight World Series from 1972–74
 March 8 – Bill Nicholson, 81, 5-time All-Star right fielder for the Cubs and Phillies who twice led the NL in home runs and RBI
 April 1 – John McSherry, 51, National League umpire since 1971 who worked in eight NLCS and two World Series
 May 3 – Alex Kellner, 71, an All-Star pitcher who played for the Athletics, Reds and Cardinals between 1948 and 1959
 May 19 – Johnny Berardino, 79, infielder for the Browns and Indians who topped 80 RBI in 1940 and 1941; became an actor, best known for the soap opera General Hospital
 May 26 – Mike Sharperson, 34, All-Star infielder for the Dodgers who batted .300 in 1992
 June 16 – Mel Allen, 83, broadcaster who spent over 35 years with the Yankees, also on national broadcasts and This Week in Baseball
 July 8 – Jim Busby, 69, All-Star center fielder for six teams who batted .312 for 1953 Senators, led AL in putouts twice; later a coach
 August 4 – Willard Brown, 81, All-Star outfielder of the Negro leagues who became the first black player to hit a home run in the American League
 September 4 – Babe Dahlgren, 84, All-Star first baseman best remembered for replacing Lou Gehrig to end his 2,130 consecutive games streak, hitting a home run in the game
 September 6 – Barney McCosky, 79, outfielder for the Tigers and Athletics who batted .312 lifetime, led AL in hits in 1940
 October 4 – Joe Hoerner, 59, All-Star reliever for seven teams who averaged 15 saves for 1966–69 Cardinals
 October 29 – Ewell Blackwell, 74, six-time All-Star pitcher for the Cincinnati Reds who came within two outs of throwing consecutive no-hitters in 1947; led NL in wins and strikeouts that season
 November 11 – Lum Harris, 81, manager who won 1969 NL West title with the Braves; previously a pitcher for the Athletics, and Houston manager
 December 27 – Gene Brabender, 55, pitcher who led the Seattle Pilots with 13 wins in their only season

Notes

References

External links
1996 Major League Baseball season schedule at Baseball Reference

 
Major League Baseball seasons